The Abadan Takhti Stadium (Persian: ورزشگاه تختى آبادان, Varzeshgāh-e Taxti-ye Ābādān) is a multi-purpose stadium built in Abadan, Khuzestan province, Iran. It is currently used mostly for football matches and is the home stadium of Sanat Naft Abadan F.C. who play in the Persian Gulf Pro League. The stadium holds 8,000 people.

Football venues in Iran
Multi-purpose stadiums in Iran
Abadan, Iran
Buildings and structures in Khuzestan Province
Sport in Khuzestan Province
Sanat Naft Abadan F.C.
1915 establishments in Iran
Sports venues completed in 1915